Eidem is a surname. Notable people with the surname include:

Ane Eidem (born 1993), Norwegian handballer
Bjarne Mørk Eidem (born 1936), Norwegian politician
Erling Eidem (1880–1972), Swedish theologian and Lutheran archbishop
Johan Lauritz Eidem (1891–1984), Norwegian politician
Knut Eidem (1918–2009), Norwegian journalist and non-fiction writer
Odd Eidem (1913–1988), Norwegian writer, journalist and literary critic
Paul Lorck Eidem (1909–1992), Norwegian writer and illustrator
Thomas Eidem (born 1859), Norwegian schoolteacher and politician